Holland High School may refer to:

Holland High School (Michigan) in Holland, Michigan
Holland Junior/Senior High School in Holland, New York
Holland High School (Texas) in Holland, Texas

See also
 Holland Patent High School in Holland Patent, New York